Events in the year 1952 in Spain.

Incumbents
Caudillo: Francisco Franco

Births
January 12 - José Bas, Olympic swimmer.
March 12 - José Javier Pomés Ruiz, politician.
May 21 - Mila Ximénez, journalist and television personality (d. 2021).
July 16 - Santiago Esteva, Olympic swimmer.
August 19 - Willy Meyer Pleite, politician.
October 1 - María Irigoyen Pérez, politician.

Deaths

See also
 List of Spanish films of 1952

References

 
Years of the 20th century in Spain
1950s in Spain
Spain
Spain